This list is of the Cultural Properties of Japan designated in the category of  for the Prefecture of Wakayama.

National Cultural Properties
As of 1 February 2015, eight Important Cultural Properties (including one *National Treasure) have been designated, being of national significance.

Prefectural Cultural Properties
As of 26 February 2014, sixteen properties have been designated at a prefectural level.

See also
 Cultural Properties of Japan
 List of National Treasures of Japan (archaeological materials)
 List of Historic Sites of Japan (Wakayama)
 List of Cultural Properties of Japan - historical materials (Wakayama)

References

External links
  Cultural Properties in Wakayama Prefecture

Archaeological materials,Wakayama
Wakayama,Cultural Properties
History of Wakayama Prefecture